The 1998 Speedway Grand Prix of Germany was the second race of the 1998 Speedway Grand Prix season. It took place on June 6 in the Rottalstadion in Pocking, Germany The second Czech Republic SGP, it was won by Swedish rider Tony Rickardsson, his second career win.

Starting positions draw 

The Speedway Grand Prix Commission nominated Gerd Riss, Robert Barth (both from Germany) and Antonín Kasper, Jr. (from Czech Republic) as Wild Card.
Draw 14.  (6) Brian Andersen →  (27) Jacek Krzyżaniak
Draw 21.  (21) Jesper B. Jensen →  (25) Peter Karlsson

Heat details

The intermediate classification

See also 
 Speedway Grand Prix
 List of Speedway Grand Prix riders

References

External links 
 FIM-live.com
 SpeedwayWorld.tv

Ge
Speedway Grand Prix
1998